Hotelling may refer to:
 Hoteling, an office organization method
 Harold Hotelling, American statistician and economist, for whom the following entries are named:
 Hotelling's rule an economic rule regarding the prices of non-renewable natural resources
 Hotelling's lemma an economic rule relating the supply of a good to the profit of the good's producer
 Hotelling's law, an economic principle regarding competition
 Hotelling's T-squared distribution, a probability distribution